In the 1993–94 season Real Club Deportivo de La Coruña competed in Primera División, Copa del Rey and UEFA Cup.

Summary 
During championship "Súper Depor" was a serious contender for the title along with FC Barcelona: on round 14 the team was +3 above blaugrana, remained at the top of the table even a defeat on round 26 against the same FC Barcelona, became the last negative result of the squad in the campaign. Deportivo closed the final rounds of the season with results included several draws in extremis. Then on the final round, the squad reached a draw 0:0 against Valencia CF with a penalty-kick missed by Miroslav Djukić at the end of the match: with a better head-to-head goal average, the Blaugrana surpassed Depor in classification, who finished the season as runners-up.

In 1993–94 Copa del Rey the squad lost 3-1 the first leg eliminated by Real Oviedo in Eightfinals. In UEFA Cup, Deportivo lost the first match 1–0 against Aalborg, won the series in the second leg 5–0. The club defeated Aston Villa in the Round of 32, in Eightfinals the team lost both legs with a score 1–0 against German side Eintracht Frankfurt, being eliminated of the tournament.

Goalkeeper Francisco Liaño repeated as winner of Zamora Trophy this time with an all-time record average of 0,47 as a result of only conceded 18 goals against in 38 matches. In addition to setting a record as the most clean sheet in one season, with 26 times.

Squad

Transfers

Competitions

La Liga

League table

Matches

Statistics

Position by round

Players Statistics

External links

References 

Deportivo de La Coruña
Deportivo de La Coruña seasons